Gizmo is the name of two fictional characters appearing in American comic books published by DC Comics. 

The character was portrayed by Dov Tiefenbach in live action in season 3 of the HBO Max series Titans.

Publication history
The Mikron O'Jeneus version of Gizmo first appeared in The New Teen Titans #3 (January 1981) and was created by George Pérez and Marv Wolfman.

Fictional character biography

Mikron O'Jeneus

A bald dwarf who flies around on a jet pack, Gizmo is a genius inventor who can turn seemingly innocuous objects like vacuum cleaners into dangerous weapons. Gizmo created a corporation which supplied technology to various people, including criminals. Hoping to increase his wealth, Gizmo joined the Fearsome Five through an ad placed in the Underworld Star, a criminal underground newsletter, by the psychopathic criminal Doctor Light.

After a number of unsuccessful conflicts with the Teen Titans (and Superman in The Adventures of Superman #430) Gizmo went straight for a while, and took a job at S.T.A.R. Labs, until his former Fearsome Five teammate Psimon, after having been seemingly killed by his teammates, resurfaced looking for revenge, and shrank Gizmo to microscopic size. Years later, Gizmo found a way to revert to his normal size, and took up a life of crime once again, partnering with his former teammate, Mammoth.

In a storyline in Outsiders (vol. 3) #12–15 (July–October 2004), frequent Captain Marvel archenemy Doctor Sivana gathered Gizmo and the others, and put the team to work for him in a scheme to short sell LexCorp stock by having them steal its accounts from its corporate building in Metropolis, and then driving down the stock by killing all the people in the building, and destroying two other Lexcorp properties. At the latter of the two, a microchip processor factory of Lexcorp's subsidiary, Kellacor, the Five were confronted by the Outsiders. After escaping, the criminally unsophisticated Five urged Sivana to take Lexcorp's nuclear missile facility near Joshua Tree, California. When Sivana refused, Psimon asserted that they would take it anyway, and in response, Sivana killed Gizmo with a laser blast to the head, and severed relations with the remaining four, warning them that he would kill them if they ever crossed his path again. Sivana used the money he made from the scheme to purchase a tropical island off the coast of Thailand to use as his lair, and the remaining members of the Five were defeated in their plan to take the facility and fire a nuclear missile at Canada.

Gizmo appeared in undead form, summoned by Brother Blood to prevent the Teen Titans from freeing Kid Eternity, in Teen Titans (vol. 3) #31 (2006). In Birds of Prey #120-121 (2008), Gizmo was reanimated by the geniuses at Macintech Research & Development, a technology company located in Platinum Flats. He disposed of their C.E.O and earned his seat on the Silicon Syndicate, a sinister group of high-tech criminals. Gizmo retained most of his brain function, but is still missing his eye and is partially decomposed.

O'Jeneus
In DC Special: Cyborg issue #5 a new Gizmo debuted who is the son of the first Gizmo. He is based visually on the animated Gizmo. After graduating from the villainous H.I.V.E Academy, the diminutive teen followed in his father's footsteps and became the second Gizmo, a high-tech super-thief. He battles Cyborg as a member of Mr. Orr's "Cyborg Revenge Squad".

The New 52
In The New 52 timeline, a version of Gizmo first appears a member of the Fearsome Five. The group appears with the Secret Society, which is allied with the Crime Syndicate. He is sent with the other members of the Fearsome Five, along with Doctor Psycho and Hector Hammond, on a mission in which he is defeated by Cyborg and the Metal Men.

DC Rebirth
In DC Rebirth, Gizmo appeared as part of the Fearsome Five.

Another using the name, Brendan Li, known as Giz, is a friend of Nightwing. He is a former villain, dating Mouse, who is a former apprentice of Catwoman. He attends the community center in Bludhaven run by Defacer and Jimmy Nice, as part of the support group of Nightwing. He is killed doing a favor for Nightwing attempting to hack into a gauntlet from Spyral, which activates defenses and electrocutes him.

Powers and abilities
Gizmo is capable of creating weaponry by transforming one machine into another, such as converting an ordinary vacuum cleaner into a tank.

In other media

Television

 A young unidentified Gizmo appears in Teen Titans, voiced by Lauren Tom in earlier appearances and by Tara Strong in the episodes "Revved Up" and "Titans Together". This version is an immature and trouble-making student of the H.I.V.E. Academy and member of the H.I.V.E. Five who often works with fellow students Jinx and Mammoth and considers himself Cyborg's rival due to their shared technological knowledge.
 Gizmo appears in Teen Titans Go!, voiced again by Lauren Tom.
 Gizmo appears in the Titans episode "Barbara Gordon", portrayed by Dov Tiefenbach.

Video games
 Gizmo appears as a boss in the 2005 Teen Titans video game, voiced again by Lauren Tom.
 Gizmo appears as a boss in the 2006 Teen Titans video game, voiced again by Lauren Tom.
 Gizmo appears in DC Universe Online, voiced by Michael Wollner. He appears as part of the "Sons of Trigon" DLC.
 Gizmo appears as a playable character in Lego DC Super-Villains, voiced again by Lauren Tom.
 Gizmo will appear in Suicide Squad: Kill the Justice League.

Miscellaneous
The Teen Titans animated series incarnation of Gizmo appears in Teen Titans Go! as a founding member of the Fearsome Five.

References

Fictional characters with dwarfism
Fictional inventors
DC Comics supervillains
Comics characters introduced in 1981
DC Comics titles
Characters created by George Pérez
Characters created by Marv Wolfman
Video game bosses